Mach 6 is the sixth studio album by MC Solaar. It was released in Europe in 2003 and in the United States on June 6, 2006.

Track listing
"Introspection" – 1:05
"La Vie est belle" – 3:53
"Hijo de Africa" – 3:23
"T’inquiète (intro)" – 0:33
"T’inquiète" – 4:02
"Guerilla" – 3:48
"Jumelles" – 3:46
"Jardin d’Éden" – 2:47
"Au pays de Gandhi" – 3:32
"J’connais mon rôle" – 3:22
"Cash Money" – 4:00
"Today Is a Good Day" (feat. Darina) – 3:13
"Souvenir" – 2:51
"Sauvez le monde" – 5:16
"Bling Bling" – 3:17
"Ça me hante" – 7:45

Certifications

References

External links
[ All Music Guide to Mach 6]

2003 albums
MC Solaar albums